The Pull of the Stars is a 2020 novel by Irish novelist Emma Donoghue first published by Little, Brown and by Picador in the UK. The novel was written in 2018-2019, and published earlier than originally planned because it was set in the 1918 influenza pandemic in Dublin, Ireland. All the characters were fictional except Dr Kathleen Lynn. The novel received strongly positive reviews from critics and was longlisted for the Giller Prize in 2020.

References 

2020 Irish novels
Novels about viral outbreaks
Novels about diseases and disorders
2020 Canadian novels
Little, Brown and Company books
Fiction set in 1918
Spanish flu in popular culture
Picador (imprint) books

Novels set in Dublin (city)
2020s LGBT novels
Irish LGBT novels
Canadian LGBT novels